Bloc Party is an EP compilation of Bloc Party's first two UK-only singles: "She's Hearing Voices" and "Banquet/Staying Fat". Released on 24 May 2004, it was Bloc Party's first V2 Records EP. It was released later in Japan in August 2004, and then in the United States by Dim Mak Records in September of the same year. The EP was lauded in Pitchfork for carefully balancing the dynamics between post-punk revival and new wave. In 2015 NME cited the EP's tracks "Banquet" and "She's Hearing Voices" as having made a splash in 2004 leading up the 2005 debut of their album "Silent Alarm". The single "Banquet", is cited by DIY Magazine as being influential on Wichita Records, then a nascent label, signing Bloc Party and notes the record impacts musicians in the genre today.

Track listing
All songs written by Bloc Party except "The Answer", written by Bloc Party and Liz Neumayr.

Personnel 

 Mark Aubrey – Producer
 Bloc Party – Producer
 Paul Epworth – Producer
 Scott McCormick – Producer
 Linsey Tulley – Illustrations
 Simon White – Management
 Tony Perrin – Management

References 

2004 debut EPs
V2 Records EPs
Bloc Party compilation albums
V2 Records compilation albums
Albums produced by Paul Epworth
Bloc Party EPs